David Griffith was a British bobsledder. He competed in the four-man event at the 1928 Winter Olympics.

References

Year of birth missing
Year of death missing
British male bobsledders
Olympic bobsledders of Great Britain
Bobsledders at the 1928 Winter Olympics
Place of birth missing